Erin Wilhelmi (born in Louisville, Kentucky) is an American actress. She is known for her role as Alice in The Perks of Being a Wallflower and Aaron Sorkin's stage adaptation of To Kill a Mockingbird.

Filmography

Film

Television

Stage

Awards and nominations

References

External links
 
 
 

21st-century American actresses
Actresses from Louisville, Kentucky
American film actresses
Living people
Year of birth missing (living people)
American television actresses
American stage actresses
University of Evansville alumni